Sir William Young, 2nd Baronet, FRS, FSA (December 1749 – 10 January 1815) was a British colonial governor, politician and owner of sugar plantations which, in 1788, included 896 enslaved Africans. He was the governor of Tobago from 1807 – January 1815, and Member of Parliament for St Mawes, 19 June 1784 – 3 November 1806, and Buckingham, 5 November 1806 – 23 March 1807.

Early years
Young was born in Charlton, then in Kent, now Greater London, in December 1749, the eldest son of Sir William Young, 1st Baronet (1724/5–1788), governor of Dominica, and his second wife, Elizabeth (1729–1801), the daughter of the mathematician Brook Taylor. His siblings included Sarah Elizabeth, Portia, Elizabeth, Mary, Henry, John, and Olivia. As a child, he and ten other family members were featured in the oil on canvas painting, The Family of Sir William Young, Baronet (ca.1766) by Johan Zoffany. He enrolled at Clare College, Cambridge in 1767 but transferred to University College, Oxford, on 26 November 1768. After graduating he travelled France and Italy and documented his travels. In 1777, he published The spirit of Athens, an acclaimed insight into the political and philosophical history of Greece.

Career

In 1782, Young he was appointed by the proprietors of the colony of Tobago to represent them in the French court to settle territorial disputes. He returned to England in 1784 where he settled and became an MP for St Mawes, Cornwall from 19 June, a seat which he held until 3 November 1806, when he was elected for Buckingham. He was elected a fellow of the Royal Society in 1786 and a fellow of the Society of Antiquaries in 1791. In 1788, his father died and passed on four sugar plantations to his son—one in Antigua, two in St Vincent, and one in Tobago—and a total of 896 African slaves. His father had also been seriously in debt and left a sum of around £110,000 (£ in  pounds) for his son to pay off. A secretary to the Association for Promoting the Discovery of the Interior Parts of Africa, Young spoke regular in parliament on poor-law reform, income tax, the slave trade, union with Ireland, foreign and colonial policy, and parliamentary reform.

On 30 October 1791, Young took a break from British politics and departed on a trip for several months in which he explored Barbados, St Vincent, Tobago, and Grenada, failing to save his plantations from bankruptcy and learn about the sugar industry and slave trade in the West Indies. He later documented part of his travels in the appendix of the second edition of An Historical Survey of the Island of Saint Domingo by Bryan Edwards in 1801, a book that defended the slave trade, in which he also served as chief editor. He printed a posthumous work of his grandfather, Brook Taylor, entitled Contemplatio Philosophica for private circulation in 1793, prefaced by a life of the author, and with an appendix containing letters by Bolingbroke, Bossuet, and others. Notable works by Young also included The rights of Englishmen, or, The British constitution of government compared with that of a democratic republic (1793); Considerations on Poorhouses and Workhouses: their Pernicious Tendency (1796), Instructions for the Armed Yeomanry (1797) and The West Indian Commonplace Book (1807).

Young reported that he had been extremely well treated by his slaves, presenting him with gifts and putting on festivities for him. On returning home to England to resume his MP duties for St Mawes in 1792, he advocated the amelioration of conditions for slaves, arguing that the trade of human beings from Africa to the islands would naturally die out without the need for parliamentary intervention. However, Young's reform plans were 'naïve and utopian', and William Wilberforce and his allies gained enough votes to pass the Slave Trade Act 1807. The same year, Young was appointed Governor of Tobago, a post which he retained until his death. He died on 10 January 1815 at Government House, Tobago.

Personal life
On 12 August 1777, he married Sarah at St George the Martyr, Queen Square, London, the daughter and coheir of Charles Lawrence and his wife, Mary. They had four sons and two daughters. Sarah died in 1791 and Young remarried on 22 April 1793 at St George, Hanover Square, London, to Barbara, the daughter of Colonel Richard Talbot and his wife, Margaret, later Baroness Talbot of Malahide. Sarah's uncle was Peter Talbot, Archbishop of Dublin. She survived Young, dying 15 years later after his death in 1830.

References

External links 
 

 
 

1749 births
1815 deaths
People from Charlton, London
Members of the Parliament of Great Britain for St Mawes
British MPs 1784–1790
British MPs 1790–1796
British MPs 1796–1800
Members of the Parliament of the United Kingdom for St Mawes
Members of the Parliament of the United Kingdom for English constituencies
UK MPs 1801–1802
UK MPs 1802–1806
UK MPs 1806–1807
Baronets in the Baronetage of Great Britain
Governors of British Tobago
Sugar plantation owners
Fellows of the Royal Society
Fellows of the Society of Antiquaries of London